The Heiltsuk Nation (Heiltsuk: Haíɫzaqv) is a First Nations government in the Central Coast region of the Canadian province of British Columbia, centred on Campbell Island in the community of Bella Bella, British Columbia.  The Heiltsuk people speak the Heiltsuk language, and were, like their language, and along with the neighbouring Haisla and Wuikinuxv (Owekeeno) peoples, incorrectly known in the past as the "Northern Kwakiutl".  The Heiltsuk were also known as the Bella Bella, after their core community.

The present day Heiltsuk First Nation is an amalgamation of 5 tribal groups who inhabited an area approximately 6000 square miles of the Central Coast of British Columbia.  The Heiltsuk peoples lived off of both land and sea in the region between Milbanke Sound and Fisher Channel.  Heiltsuk territories include numerous inlets, islands, peninsulas, mountains and valleys. Rivers and streams cascade into the sea through heavy forests and dense undergrowth.‘‘Oral traditions of the present-day Heiltsuk maintain that the first generation of their ancestors were "set-down" by the Maker in various places within Heiltsuk territory and were living here before the time of a Great Flood.’  Geological evidence shows people have been living there continuously for the past 14,000 years. 1,400 of the 2,200 Heiltsuk membership live on Campbell Island, which is approximately 78 nautical miles from the British Columbia mainland, and 98 nautical miles from Vancouver Island.

The 1997 Supreme Court of Canada decision in R. v. Gladstone found that the Heiltsuk have an Aboriginal right to trade in Herring. This was the first decision recognizing a commercial Aboriginal right in Canada. Despite winning the decision, the dispute over Heiltsuk access to herring, and management of the stock have persisted. The 2015 herring season saw a crisis develop between the Heiltsuk and Canada, including occupation of a DFO office. The crisis ended when the commercial herring gillnet fleet departed without fishing.

A fire destroyed the only food store in the village recently. As a stop-gap measure the United Church became the "United Store" while a new building was constructed. This response occurred very quickly and managed to provide services to the community during a difficult time.

The Heiltsuk have been opposed to the Enbridge Northern Gateway Pipelines proposal, with some well-publicized hearings in Bella Bella.

The Heiltsuk became involved in early efforts in the 1990s to conserve the Great Bear Rainforest. On January 29, 2016, in the Heiltsuk community of Bella Bella—along with representatives from other First Nations, industry, government and NGOs—they celebrated the completion of the final accord to protect the largest coastal temperate rainforest in the world.

Archeologist Alisha Gauvreau, a PhD student from the University of Victoria and a scholar with the Hakai Institute, discovered a site on Triquet Island on British Columbia's Central Coast which appears to confirm Heiltsuk oral tradition.  The archeological team have excavated a settlement in the area — in traditional Heiltsuk Nation territory — and dated it to 14,000 years ago, during the last ice age where glaciers covered much of North America.

Chief and Councillors
The Heiltsuk Nation elects a chief and 11 councillors who serve a 2-4 year term. Elections are conducted through a custom code based on the Indian Act. The most recent election was in 2018.

The current council composition is as follows:

Language

The Heiltsuk, are speakers of Heiltsuk-Oowekyala, which is the central member of the northern branch of the Wakashan language family. The Heiltsuk call their language Hailhzaqvla, which means "the Heiltsuk language".

The Heiltsuk also knew and used the Chinook jargon—a trade jargon used to communicate across languages.

Economic Development
Established by the Heiltsuk Tribal council in 2006, the Heiltsuk Economic Development Corporation (HEDC), manages the business affairs of the Heiltsuk people. HEDC was developed to create an effective separation between business and politics in support of achieving the communities economic development goals.

Education and Cultural Institutions
The Heiltsuk Cultural Education Centre is located in the Bella Bella Community School (Right, High school wing). Founded in 1975, the Heiltsuk Cultural Education Centre marked the Heiltsuk (then known as the Bella Bella Indian Band) determination to ensure the preservation and revitalization of Heiltsuk culture.

For over twenty years, the Heiltsuk Cultural Education Centre has been devoted to researching, preserving, and revitalizing the history, language and cultural traditions of the Heiltsuk Nation, located on the Central Coast of British Columbia, Canada. Heiltsuk Cultural Centre website.

Revival of ocean-going canoes. The Heiltsuk hosted a major ocean-going canoe festival in Bella Bella in July 2014. Some 60 canoes from as far away as Washington State, as well from Nations all up and down the coast traveled to Bella Bella for the Qatuwas Festival.

The Heiltsuk were subjected to the Indian Residential School system for much of the 20th century. The struggle to achieve a Heiltsuk-run school is referred to in the 1975 NFB film "Bella Bella." The Bella Bella Community School is a Heiltsuk-run school offering k-12 schooling.

Great Bear Rainforest

The Heiltsuk "territory is located at the heart" of the largest intact old-growth forest in the world, the Great Bear Rainforest. The Great Bear Rainforest was officially recognized by the Government of British Columbia in February 2016, and is Canada's contribution to the Queen's Commonwealth Canopy (QCC), a unique indigenous forest conservation initiative established in 2015 which now includes 16 of the 52 Commonwealth nations Industrial logging in the Great Bear Rainforest will be decreased in order to permanently conserve 85% of the forest.

On October 13, 2016, an American tugboat, the Nathan E Stewart, holding approximately 200,000 litres of industrial oils including diesel, while attached to a massive empty American oil barge, ran hard aground on a reef off Athlone Island near Bella Bella when the tugboat missed its turn into Seaforth Channel while transiting in Canadian waters on its return trip from Alaska.

Heiltsuk Herring Rights, R. v. Gladstone and Dispute with DFO
The Heiltsuk have a long history and relationship with herring. The 1997 Supreme Court of Canada decision R. v. Gladstone was a significant legal and constitutional victory for the Heiltsuk. The SCC found that the Heiltsuk have a pre-existing Aboriginal right to herring that includes a commercial element.

Since the Gladstone decision was rendered the Heiltsuk have been in a dispute with Canada regarding implementation of the ruling as well as with the science used by DFO. The dispute boiled over in 2015 with the Heiltsuk occupying the local DFO office.

Notes on Nomenclature
The Heiltsuk are not well known among non-Aboriginal people. Part of this is due to the confusing terminology applied to First Nations over time. The Heiltsuk have been subsumed, inaccurately, as 'Northern Kwakiutl', Kwakiutl, and have also been known as Bella Bella (Indians), Milbanke Indians and by tribal terminology that applies to smaller tribal groups of the Heiltsuk.

See also

 Aboriginal peoples in Canada
Bella Bella, BC
 Chinook jargon
Old Bella Bella
Fort McLoughlin
Heiltsuk
Northwest coast art

References

Heiltsuk Cultural Education Center website 
The Virtual Village Project - Heiltsuk, SFU website
Heiltsuk Nation responds to Federal Government decision on Enbridge’s Northern Gateway Pipeline Project

External links

BC Treaty.net entry
Heiltsuk Cultural Education Centre 
Bella Bella Community School 

First Nations governments in British Columbia
Heiltsuk